Adolf "Adi" Baumgarten (Hamburg, 3 May 1915 – Nevel, Soviet Union, 2 October 1942) was a German boxer who competed in the 1936 Summer Olympics.

In 1936 he was eliminated in the quarter-finals of the middleweight class after losing his fight to the upcoming silver medalist Henry Tiller. Furthermore, he won a silver medal himself at the 1942 European Amateur Boxing Championships in January of that year.

He was killed in action during World War II.

References

External links
profile

1915 births
1942 deaths
Sportspeople from Hamburg
Middleweight boxers
Olympic boxers of Germany
Boxers at the 1936 Summer Olympics
German military personnel killed in World War II
German male boxers